Tia is a given name and at times a surname. It may refer to:

People

Mononym
 TiA (born 1987), female Japanese singer
 Tia (singer), female Japanese singer
 Tia (Maori explorer), early Māori explorer and chief
 Tia (princess) an ancient Egyptian princess during the 19th dynasty
 Tia (overseer of treasury), ancient Egyptian official, husband of Princess Tia

Given name
 Tia Bajpai (born 1989), Indian actress and singer
 Tia Ballard (born 1986), American actress, artist, comedian, writer, and voice actress for FUNimation Entertainment
 Tia Barrett (1947–2009), New Zealand diplomat
 Tia Carrere (born 1967), American-Canadian actress, model and singer
 Tia DeNora, professor of Sociology of Music and director of research at the University of Exeter
 Tia Doca (1932–2009), Brazilian samba dancer
 Tia Fuller (born 1976), American saxophonist, composer, and educator
 Tia Hellebaut (born 1978), Belgian Olympic champion and athlete 
 Tia Kar, Indian actress and singer
 Tia Keyes, Irish specialist in photochemistry and molecular spectroscopy
 Tia Lessin, American documentary filmmaker
 Tia Mowry (born 1978), American actress  and singer
 Tia Neiva (1926–1985), Brazilian medium
 Tia Paschal (born 1969), American retired women's basketball player
 Tia Powell, American psychiatrist and bioethicist
 Tia Ray (born 1984), Chinese singer-songwriter
 Tia Sharp, a 12-year-old English schoolgirl and murder victim; see Murder of Tia Sharp
 Tia Shorts, American beauty queen
 Tia Texada (born 1971), American actress and singer

Surname
 John Tia (born 1954), Ghanaian politician
 Olivier Tia (born 1982), Ivorian footballer

Fictional characters
 Tia and Megumi Oumi, characters in the anime and manga series Zatch Bell!
 Tia, a character in the French TV series Galactik Football
 Tia, a Diva Starz doll
 T.I.A., a secret spy agency from Spanish comic series Mort & Phil

See also
Tia (goddess), a goddess in the Haida religion
TIA (disambiguation)